Noise calculation is the process of calculating the level of noise immission using the metric dB(A). Noise immission is created by noise sources (noise emission) of various types which are propagating noise into the environment. A single source will create a certain level of immission primarily driven by originating sound power level and distance influenced by e.g. absorption and reflection. Several noise sources result in typically higher levels of immission. The method or process of determining the resulting immission level is called noise calculation, its graphical representation is called noise map.

Noise calculation is done for the following reasons:
 to calculate a current situation based on existing physics, mostly when a physical measurement at a location is impractical
 to predict the resulting immission levels based on a planned change, e.g. set up of a new machine
Mostly, noise calculation is part of any such planning process and may become part of the decision process for physical change

Environment engineering differentiates between:
 indoor sound propagation, e.g. occupational health considerations
 outdoor sound propagation, e.g. city planning considerations as well as type of noise source, e.g.
 industrial noise
 rail or air traffic noise
 road noise

Each of before mentioned require different algorithms for noise calculation which have been defined over time in a number of different national or international standards. As an example, outdoor sound propagation is defined in ISO standard 9613 which can be received from the ISO organisation or scientific literature.

Calculation standards 

This list of widely accepted noise calculation standards is incomplete, and new standards may be under development:

 ISO 9613 parts 1 and 2 defines the calculation methods for outdoor sound propagation (International)
 VDI2714 and VDI2720 Schallausbreitung und Schallschutz im Freien (outdoor sound propagation, Germany)
 DIN18005 Schallschutz im Städtebau (noise protection in cities, Germany)
 TA Laerm Technische Anleitung zum Schutz gegen Lärm (Germany)
 VDI-Richtlinie 3745 Blatt 1 Beurteilung von Schießgeräuschimmissionen (Germany)
 BS 5228 Code of practice for noise and vibration control on construction and open sites (UK)
 RLS-90 Richtlinien für den Lärmschutz an Straßen (noise protection at roads/traffic, Germany)
 CRTN calculation of road traffic noise (UK)
 Schall03 Schienenlärm (calculation of rail noise, Germany)

Mathematical background

Data capture 

NoiseScore is a mobile app for crowdsourcing community noise.

Calculation tools 

Noise experts and some small specialized companies have slowly developed a limited number of calculation tools, which have increased in number and become more user-friendly, covering more application cases, and adding service elements to the noise calculation tools. The noise calculation process is complex in input (gathering data, correctly modeling acoustic elements in the field) and from a pure compute power perspective, recently advances involved:
 moving calculation routines into self-contained calculation engines
 adapting CAD systems for input of acoustic models
 moving into 3D for displaying models or even data capture
 moving into cloud services and web enabled calculation tools.

The quality of results from the noise calculation depends on the quality of the acoustic data provided and the capability of the noise calculation engine.o take decisions.

Some more widely used noise calculation software packages are:
 noise3D online 
 Code_Tympan 
 IMMI 
 Olive Tree Lab Terrain
Some online tools used for noise calculations are:
 acoustics.io - construction noise calculator

See also 

 Active noise control
 Association of Noise Consultants
 Background noise
 Impulse noise (audio)
 International Noise Awareness Day
 Loud music
 Noise and vibration on maritime vessels
 Noise control
 Noise in music
 Noise music
 Noise pollution
 Noise reduction
 Silence
 Sound level meter
 Soundscape
 The Hum
 White noise (disambiguation)

References

External sources 
 ISO 1996 - Description, measurement and assessment of environmental noise
 Directive 2002/49/EC of the European Parliament and of the council, of 25 June 2002 relating to the assessment and management of environmental noise
 ISO 9613. Acoustics—Attenuation of sound during propagation outdoors
 European Commission – Noise policy
 Centro de Acústica y evaluación no destructiva (UPM-CSIC)
 NOISE3D ONLINE

Noise pollution